William Mellen may refer to:

 William H. Mellen (1829–1907), American politician
 William M. E. Mellen (1848–1906), American physician and mayor of Chicopee, Massachusetts